Hopewell Mill is an unincorporated community in Monroe County, Tennessee, United States. It lies at an elevation of 820 feet (250 m).

References

Unincorporated communities in Monroe County, Tennessee
Unincorporated communities in Tennessee